TN3 or TN-3 may refer to:
 Tn3 transposon, a mobile genetic element found in prokaryotes
 Tennessee's 3rd congressional district
 Tennessee State Route 3
 Honda TNIII, a pickup truck
 TN3, a postcode district in Tunbridge Wells, England; see TN postcode area